Gazanaler is a mountain in the Zangezur Mountains range of the Armenian Highlands. The mountain rises  and is situated between the border of Armenian province of Syunik and the Nakhchivan Autonomous Republic.

See also
Mount Kaputjugh

Mountains